The 50 Greatest Love Songs is a greatest hits collection by American rock and roll singer and musician Elvis Presley released on September 11, 2001. 

The album is a double compilation release, featuring 50 of the greatest love songs recorded by Elvis. The first disc encompasses some of Elvis's greatest hits, whereas the second features more from Elvis' earlier period, including 10 Gold singles. All releases' covers are red, except for the British version, which is blue. The CD is notable for having printing and pressing information mistakes, as well as tracks duration incorrectly listed.

The 50 Greatest Love Songs was first released in UK, on September 11, 2001, and later released in Europe and USA, on November 12, 2001. That same year, the compilation was released in Asia, and Australia, where it put Elvis back into Top 30 for the first time in 20 years.

Track listing

Formats
 US cassette edition – 2-tape edition containing 50 songs.
 CD UK edition – 2-disc edition containing 50 songs, blue cover.
 CD Europe and US edition – 2-disc edition containing 50 songs, red cover.
 Digital download  – Digital edition, containing the same 50 songs from the cassette and CD edition.

Personnel 
Credits adapted from the album's liner notes.

Production
Project Director – Victoria Sarro
Compilation – Ernst Mikael Jorgensen Roger Semon
Digital Engineer – Dennis Farrante

Design
Photography – Joseph A. Tunzi

Companies
Licensed From – Sony BMG Music Entertainment, RCA

Charts

Weekly charts

Year-end charts

Certifications

References

Elvis Presley compilation albums
2001 greatest hits albums
Bertelsmann Music Group compilation albums
Compilation albums published posthumously